Kaj Andersen (4 November 1943 – 15 September 1973) was a Danish athlete. He competed in the men's discus throw at the 1972 Summer Olympics.

References

External links
 

1943 births
1973 deaths
Athletes (track and field) at the 1972 Summer Olympics
Danish male discus throwers
Olympic athletes of Denmark
Place of birth missing